Julia Pastrana (August 1834 – 25 March 1860) was a performer and singer during the 19th century who had hypertrichosis. Pastrana, an indigenous woman from Mexico, was born in 1834, somewhere in the state of Sinaloa. She was born with a genetic condition, hypertrichosis terminalis (or generalized hypertrichosis lanuginosa); her face and body were covered with straight black hair. Her ears and nose were unusually large, and her teeth were irregular. The latter condition was caused by a rare disease, undiagnosed in her lifetime, gingival hyperplasia, which thickened her lips and gums.

Life and career
Multiple versions of Pastrana's early life exist. Literature produced by those who managed the freak shows she appeared in described her as belonging to a Native American tribe called "Root Diggers" whose members were similar to apes and lived in caves. In this version, it is said that a woman identified only as Mrs. Espinosa was kidnapped by the tribe and held in a cave and took Pastrana with her when she was able to escape. In another version, which is based on the words of indigenous villagers in Ocoroni, Mexico, Pastrana was a local girl whom they referred to as "wolf woman." In this version, Pastrana lived with her mother until her mother passed away, after which, her uncle sold her to the circus. Both accounts claim that, at some point, she lived in the home of Pedro Sanchez, the then-governor of Sinaloa, and left the home in 1854.

According to Ireneo Paz, Francisco Sepúlveda, a customs official in Mazatlán, purchased Pastrana and brought her to the United States. At first, Pastrana performed under the management of J.W. Beach, but in 1854, she eloped with Theodore Lent, marrying him in Baltimore, Maryland. Lent took over her management, and they toured throughout the US and Europe. Pastrana was advertised as a hybrid between an animal and a human and worked in sideshows and freak shows under the stage names the "Baboon Lady", the "Dog-faced Woman", the "Hairy Woman", the "Ape-faced Woman",
the "Ape Woman", the "Bear Woman", and "The Nondescript". However, during her performances, she demonstrated her intelligence and talent: singing, dancing, and interacting with the audience.

During a tour in Moscow, Pastrana gave birth to a son, with features similar to her own. The child survived only three days, and Pastrana died of postpartum complications five days later.

Medical examinations

During her life, Pastrana's management arranged to have her examined by doctors and scientists, using their evaluations in advertisements to attract a larger audience. One doctor, Alexander B. Mott, M.D., certified that she was specifically the result of the mating of a human and an "Orang hutan". Another, Dr. S. Brainerd of Cleveland, declared that she was of a "distinct species". Francis Buckland stated that she was "only a deformed Mexican Indian woman". Samuel Kneeland, Jr., a comparative anatomist of the Boston Society of Natural History, declared that she was human and of Indian descent.

Charles Darwin discussed her case after her death, describing her as follows: "Julia Pastrana, a Spanish dancer, was a remarkably fine woman, but she had a thick masculine beard and a hairy forehead; she was photographed, and her stuffed skin was exhibited as a show; but what concerns us is, that she had in both the upper and lower jaw an irregular double set of teeth, one row being placed within the other, of which Dr. Purland took a cast. From the redundancy of the teeth her mouth projected, and her face had a gorilla-like appearance".

After death

After Pastrana's death, Lent sold her body and their son's body to Professor Sukolov of Moscow University who permanently preserved them. Her body was taxidermically preserved. The process was a blend of taxidermy techniques and embalming chemicals. Although generically referred to as a "mummy" by some authors, her preserved body was technically not a mummy because it was not mummified. Her body was "stuffed", as noted by renowned naturalist and taxidermist Charles Darwin. After the bodies were preserved by Sukolov, Lent re-purchased them from him and began exhibiting them throughout Europe. Lent later found another woman with similar features, married her and changed her name from Marie Bartel to Zenora Pastrana, becoming wealthy from her exhibition.

For over a hundred years, the bodies of Pastrana and her son were displayed around the world in museums, circuses and amusement parks. They appeared in Norway in 1921 and toured the US as late as 1972. Later that year, a tour of Sweden drew considerable public opposition, leading to the bodies being withdrawn from public view. Vandals broke into the storage facility in August 1976 and damaged the baby's body. The remains were consumed by mice. Julia's preserved body was stolen in 1979, but stored at the Oslo Forensic Institute after the body was reported to police but not identified. It was identified in 1990 and for many years rested in a sealed coffin at the Department of Anatomy, Oslo University. In 1994, the Norway Senate recommended burying her remains, but the Minister of Sciences decided to keep them, so scientists could perform research. A special permit was required to gain access to her remains.

On 2 August 2012, it was reported in Aftenposten that Pastrana would finally be buried in Mexico at an unspecified date. In February 2013, with the help of Sinaloa state governor Mario López Valdez, New York-based visual artist Laura Anderson Barbata, Norwegian authorities, and others, the body was turned over to the government of Sinaloa and her burial was planned.  Hundreds of people attended her Catholic funeral, and her remains were buried in a cemetery in Sinaloa de Leyva, a town near her birthplace. Filmmaker  Eva Aridjis filmed the burial for her feature documentary "Chuy, The Wolf Man", a portrait of a modern-day Mexican family with congenital hypertrichosis.

Theatre
A musical Pastrana by Australian writers Allan McFadden and Peter Northwood was performed by Melbourne's Church Theatre in 1989. The production was nominated for five Melbourne Green Room Awards.

A play based on Pastrana's life, The True History of the Tragic Life and Triumphant Death of Julia Pastrana, the Ugliest Woman in the World (1998) was written by Shaun Prendergast. A 2003 Texas production of the play staged by Kathleen Anderson Culebro, sister of Laura Anderson Barbata, led to the campaign by Anderson Barbata to repatriate Pastrana's remains from Norway to Mexico.

Film
Marco Ferreri's film The Ape Woman (1964) is based on Pastrana's life story.

On 14 October 2013 the in-development movie "Velvet" was announced, based on the life and experiences of Julia Pastrana, and from an original screenplay by Celso García and Francisco Payó González. "Velvet" is directed by Celso García and is an international production with the support of various personalities behind and in front of the camera. The announcement appeared in an article published in Mexican newspaper "Mural", member of the editorial group Reforma.

Music
The Ass Ponys wrote and recorded the song Julia Pastrana about her life on their 1993 album Grim.

The musical supergroup Apparatjik released a single titled "Julia" on March 20, 2020, accompanied by a lyric video.

See also 

 Bearded lady
 Alice Elizabeth Doherty, "The Minnesota Woolly Girl"
 Annie Jones, "The Bearded Woman"
 Krao Farini, "The Missing Link"
 Ferriman-Gallwey score
 Negro of Banyoles, example of a taxidermied human
 Repatriation of human remains
 Sarah Baartman
 Human Zoo

Notes

References

 Bartra, Roger. "El trágico viaje de una mujer salvaje mexicana al mundo civilizado". Istor 64 (2016): 179-198. México.

External links
 Julia Pastrana Online

1834 births
1860 deaths
Deaths in childbirth
Indigenous Mexicans
Mummies
People from Sinaloa
People with hypertrichosis
Sideshow performers
Bearded women
19th-century circus performers
Indigenous Mexican women
Human taxidermy
Ethnological show business